Malluvium is a genus of small sea snails, limpet-like cap snails, marine gastropod molluscs in the family Hipponicidae, the hoofshells or hoof snails.

Species
Species within the genus Malluvium include:
Malluvium calcareum (Suter, 1909)
Malluvium devotum (Hedley, 1904)
Malluvium lissum (E. A. Smith, 1894)

References

Further reading 

Hipponicidae
Gastropod genera